Aotea may refer to:

Aotea, Māori name for Great Barrier Island
Aotea (canoe), one of the canoes in which Māori migrated to New Zealand
Aotea, New Zealand, a suburb of Porirua
Aotea Harbour, on the west coast of the North Island of New Zealand
Aotea Lagoon, on the North Island of New Zealand
Aotea Square, in downtown Auckland

See also
 
 Aotearoa (disambiguation)